was a male Chinese-born giant panda who resided at the Ueno Zoo, the largest zoo in Tokyo, Japan. At the time of his death at the age of 22, Ling Ling was the only giant panda at the Ueno Zoo and the oldest panda in Japan. He served as an important symbol of the Ueno Zoo and of friendship between Japan and China. Ling Ling, who was given to Japan in 1992, was the only giant panda in the country who was directly owned by Japan. There are eight other giant pandas in Japan as of April 2008, but they are all on loan to Japan from China. Despite being a male panda, Ling Ling's name meant "darling little girl" in Chinese.

Early years and life at the zoo
Ling Ling was born at the Beijing Zoo in Beijing, China, on September 5, 1985. He was given to Japan and the Ueno Zoo in November 1992 by China in exchange for a panda which had been born in Japan. The 1992 panda exchange, between China and Japan, which is often called Panda diplomacy, took place to commemorate the 20th anniversary of the normalization of bilateral Sino-Japanese relations in 1972. He remained one of the Ueno Zoo's most popular attractions for over 15 years.

The Ueno Zoo paired Ling Ling with a female panda named Tong Tong. The two pandas became mates, but were unable to breed successfully and produced no offspring. Tong Tong died in 2000, leaving Ling Ling as the only giant panda at the Ueno Zoo. The zoo had tried unsuccessfully to have Ling Ling breed with other pandas since 2001 using artificial insemination. Ling Ling was even sent out of Japan to Mexico three times in an attempt to have him mate with other pandas.

Death
Ling Ling's health began to deteriorate in August 2007 due to old age, with symptoms such as loss of strength and appetite. He had been on medication since September 2007 for his ailments, which included heart and kidney problems. He was removed from public display at the zoo on April 29, 2008, at the beginning of the zoo's Golden Week holiday season. The zoo explained that Ling Ling would be removed from display in order to undergo intensive care treatments.

Despite the treatments, Ling Ling died at the Ueno Zoo at approximately 2 A.M. on April 30, 2008, just one day after he was withdrawn from public exhibition. A necropsy found that he had died of heart failure. He was 22 years, seven months, and 5 days old, which is roughly equivalent to 70 years old for a human. According to the Ueno Zoo, Ling Ling was the oldest panda in Japan, as well as the fifth oldest known captive male panda in the world at the time of his death. Ling Ling's portrait and favorite food, bamboo shoots, were displayed in his cage following his death. Zoo visitors left bouquets of flowers and signed condolence registers.

Legacy

Ling Ling's death left the Ueno Zoo without a resident giant panda for the first time in 36 years; since October 1972 when two pandas, Kang Kang and Lan Lan, were given to the zoo to mark the normalization of bilateral relations between Japan and China. The Ueno Zoo reportedly fears a drop in its number of visitors due to the loss of Ling Ling. Approximately 3.5 million people visit the Ueno Zoo each year, including about 40,000 people per day on holidays and weekends. However, many visitors came specifically to see Ling Ling and other panda related attractions. Without Ling Ling, or another giant panda to replace him, the zoo fears that it may be unable to maintain current visitor numbers without the pandas. The Ueno Zoo is reportedly consulting the Japanese Foreign Ministry about obtaining a new panda from China.

Ling Ling was the only giant panda in Japan which was directly owned by the government or a Japanese institution. There are still eight other pandas located throughout Japan. However, each of these remaining eight pandas are currently on loan from China and are not Japanese owned. Six of the Chinese pandas are currently housed at Adventure World, which is located in Shirahama, Wakayama Prefecture, while two other pandas resident at the Kobe Municipal Oji Zoo in Kobe.

Following Ling Ling's death, Japanese Prime Minister Yasuo Fukuda asked Chinese President Hu Jintao for two more pandas.

Ling Ling's death in April 2008 marked the second high profile death of an "elderly" captive panda in less than one month. On April 2, 2008, Taotao, the oldest giant panda in captivity in China, died at the Jinan Zoo at the age of 36.

References

External links 
 Ueno Zoo

Individual giant pandas
2008 animal deaths
1985 animal births
Animals as diplomatic gifts
China–Japan relations